Du Pan syndrome, also known as fibular hypoplasia and complex brachydactyly is an extremely rare genetic disorder which is characterized by hypoplasia, aplasia or dysplasia of the fibula, under-developee/abnormally developed hands and feet and rather complex brachydactyly. Unlike other rare genetic disorders, Du Pan syndrome doesn't affect traits like intellect or the appearance of the head and trunk To this day (May 2022), 18 cases have been reported in medical literature. This disorder is associated with mutations in the CDCP1 gene, in chromosome 20q11.2. The mode of inheritance varies family from family, but it is most commonly inherited in an autosomal recessive manner, rare cases (at least 1) have families where the mode of inheritance is autosomal dominant.

References 

Genetic diseases and disorders
Rare syndromes